Gabriel Traversari (born Gabriel Augusto Traversari y Debayle on September 7, 1963) is a Nicaraguan American actor, director, writer, singer, songwriter, painter and photographer.

Early life
Traversari was born in Los Angeles, California, but grew up in El Crucero, a municipality just outside Managua, Nicaragua.

He attended the Rectory School, a junior boarding school in Pomfret, Connecticut and graduated from Middlesex School in Concord, Massachusetts. Traversari went on to graduate from Florida State University in Tallahassee, Florida with a Bachelor of Arts in acting.  While in school he performed on stage in Twelfth Night (as Antonio), The Apple Tree (as Adam), Princess Ida (as Cyril), Macbeth (as Macduff), Infancy (as Avonzino), What the Butler Saw (as Nick), The Sea Gull (as Trigorin), Romeo and Juliet (as Romeo), The Lost Colony (as A. Dare/J. Borden) and Camino Real (as Abdullah).

Career
Once Traversari graduated from college he moved to Miami, where he was hired as the co-host of Univision's first major original production, TV Mujer (1988–1990), an international talk show which he co-hosted for three years. Traversari also starred in other popular television programs which aired in Latin America and Spain including "Mejorando su Hogar", the first home improvement show produced in Spanish in the United States, and "Casa Club Magazine".

Traversari went on to produce, direct and host "Un Día de Fama" and many episodes for the "Behind the Scenes" series for E! Entertainment, in Latin America. He also became that network's Miami-based entertainment correspondent for over three years.

In 2004 he began hosting "Esotérica" on Cosmopolitan Television. He was also cast as one of the lead voices for the Spanish version of Duckman, the Emmy Award-winning cartoon, and as the voice of "Juan del Diablo" in the English translation of the soap opera, Corazón Salvaje. He has appeared on various television series such as Miami Vice (1988), as well as small credited appearances in movies such as Something Wild (1986), Once Upon A Time in America (1984) and Two Much (1995). He was cast as the lead in the independent low budget feature, "Murder on the Border", where he starred alongside Mexican actress Alpha Acosta (2005). He has also appeared in various Spanish speaking TV shows such as "Decisiones" and "Lotería" and three Telemundo soap operas "Anita no te Rajes", "El Cuerpo del Deseo" and "Pecados Ajenos".

Traversari produced, directed and hosted the TV series "Las Espectaculares Casas" for Casa Club TV, a subdivision of MGM Networks, Latin America.

He returned to his country, Nicaragua, in 2008 and began to spear-head a series of personal and very successful initiatives. He produced "Latin Flavors", the first and most prestigious Food Festival in his country and a platform that ultimately launched the careers of many of the current Nicaraguan TV chefs and gastronomical celebrities. He also created and managed "Myla Vox", a young musical group that emerged from the local "barrios" and ignited a pop cultural frenzy that lasted over 6 years before the band finally separated. Gabriel also founded the "Central American Music Conference" as an opportunity to unite regional talent with top international record industry executives. The first conference, held in Nicaragua, brought grammy winner KC Porter, music empresario Bruno del Granado, producer/composers such as Marco Flores and Victor Daniel, record label executives such as Jorge Mejía (Sony/ATV Publishing) and Aldo Gonzalez (Machete Music) and music promoters like Joe Granda. Additionally, he created the "Nicaraguan Music Awards", a platform that, for at least two years, honored and recognized Nicaragua's varicolored music community.

He wrote his first book of poetry, "Before the Dawn", in 1996. It was during the writing of that book that he became interested in drawing. He has since begun to showcase his work publicly, and in 2014 he completed and presented an exhibit entitled: "Akropolis: Rasgos y Restos de una Cultura Helénica." He launched his first photography book entitled, "Vernaculo: Encuentros con mi Tierra" (an anthropological study and an aesthetic homage to the people of his country), which had its debut presentation at the Palace of Culture in Nicaragua in the summer of 2008, followed by numerous other publications including: "The Dictator's Daughter" (a biographical account based on the life of Lillian Somoza Debayle, daughter of Nicaragua's notorious military dictator, Anastasio Somoza García), released in 2015 to critical acclaim; "Azul y Blanco: 90 minutos que unieron Nicaragua" (a photo-journalistic account of a historical soccer match that altered the course of Nicaragua's national football league), launched in 2016; "El niño y el pregonero" (a short story  about two young boys from contrasting social backgrounds whose serendipitous encounter has a deep and long lasting impact on their burgeoning, impressionable lives), published in 2018; "Hecho en Nicaragua: 100 destacadas personalidades nicaraguenses contemporáneas (a "coffee table book" that profiles the lives of extraordinary Nicaraguans who have left an indelible mark in the world), released in 2020; and more recently, "Verso y Voz", a companion piece to an audio project that celebrates the best of Central American poetry, and was produced to commemorate the bicentennial of the region's independence. For this particular "rescue campaign", as Traversari calls it, the Nicaraguan producer recruited 30 renowned Spanish speaking personalities from Mexico, Spain and the US. A digital platform was created to promote the art of poetry amongst students (and the younger demographic), and bring back a much needed appreciation for the simple yet profound joys of reading. This is the direct access to the project's web site:  www.versoyvoz.com  

In the 1990s, Traversari founded the "Fundación Cultural Hispanoamericana" for the purpose of promoting the vision of young Hispanic artists, and years later he collaborated with "The Future of Nicaragua Foundation", developing several culturally driven projects in his country, including a historical music concert that brought together more than 50 Nicaraguan artists and international personalities such as Laura León, Victor Noriega and Sebastian Ligarde. All this prepared him for what he has become: a diligent and devout promoter of Nicaraguan culture in all its various manifestations, and all the work he has done in the last decade clearly attests to that.

Traversari managed to host many beauty pageants throughout his life, including "Miss Nicaragua", "Miss Panama", "Nuestra Belleza- El Paso" and "Miss Carnaval"; song festivals such as "La OTI- Nicaragua", "La OTI- Nueva York" and "La OTI -Tampa"; television specials such as "Fiesta en America" and "La Casa de sus Sueños" for Pepsi Cola, "Año Nuevo, Vida Nueva" for Golden Hill Productions and numerous guest hosting appearances for Televisa Espectaculos. He has served as jury member for the "OTI Nacional" and "Nuestra Belleza".
 
In 2002. Traversari shot his first documentary project entitled "Por Los Caminos", a 24-hour journey through the streets of Managua that was screened at eight film festivals all over the world, including the "Miami International Film Festival", the "Havana Film Festival (Festival del Nuevo Cine Latinoamericano)", the "London Latin Film Festival" and others. In 2020 he directed his first short film, "La Carpa", which was also accepted in over 15 film festivals worldwide and received awards in various categories.

Traversari could be seen making a cameo appearance in TLC's 90 Day Fiancé.

In 2002 he launched his one and only music production; "Luna de Piel"

Discography
Luna de miel

Awards and recognition
Acrin; Host of the Year – (twice) by the North American Critics Association
"Güegüense de Bronze" – by the Lions' Club Miami/Managua
"Mundaje de Oro" – by the Association of Nicaraguan Artists
"Punk of the Year" – by the Galaxy of Stars association.

References

External links
 His webpage 
 
 Planet CD article
 Miami Film Festival

1963 births
Living people
Florida State University alumni
American male television actors
American male film actors
Nicaraguan artists
Nicaraguan male film actors
Nicaraguan male television actors
20th-century Nicaraguan poets
Nicaraguan male poets
Nicaraguan male writers
American writers of Nicaraguan descent
21st-century Nicaraguan male singers
Middlesex School alumni